The Melbourne Victory 2009–10 season was Melbourne Victory's fifth A-League season.

Season summary
From the 2009–10 season, Greek gambling giant Intralot became the Melbourne Victory's new major sponsor to replace Samsung in a two-year deal valued at $2 million. Their logo subsequently featured on the front of Melbourne Victory's strip.

The Victory made some off-season changes by releasing Steve Pantelidis and Michael Thwaite to Gold Coast United, Sebastian Ryall was transferred to Sydney FC, and veteran goalkeeper Michael Theoklitos ended his contract and later joined Norwich City F.C. Moreover, José Luis López Ramírez's loan spell was terminated from Deportivo Saprissa and Daniel Allsopp moved to Al Rayyan.

Several new signings were made, bringing New Zealand international goalkeeper Glen Moss from Wellington Phoenix, Thai midfielder Surat Sukha from Chonburi FC, the promotion of Mathew Theodore and Matthew Foschini from the youth squad and the permanent signing of veteran Carlos Hernández from L.D. Alajuelense for three years (after his two-year loan).

Meanwhile, Mate Dugandžić was signed from Melbourne Knights, Robbie Kruse from Brisbane Roar, Marvin Angulo from Club Sport Herediano and Sutee Suksomkit was signed as a nine match guest player.

On 1 December 2009, it was announced that Ney Fabiano was leaving Melbourne and had signed a contract with Thai Premier League team Bangkok Glass FC for the 2010 season.

The Victory finished second to Sydney FC on the ladder and lost the 2010 A-League Grand Final to Sydney 4–2 on penalties.

Melbourne Victory were drawn into Group E in the 2010 AFC Champions League along with Seongnam Ilhwa Chunma, Beijing Guoan and Kawasaki Frontale. With key players Archie Thompson, Matthew Kemp and Billy Celeski sidelined for long term injuries, Victory finished bottom of Group E.

Players

First team squad

Transfers

In

Out

Matches

2009-10 pre-season friendlies

2009-10 Hyundai A-League fixtures

2009-10 finals series

Statistics

Goals

Ladder

Finals

AFC Champions League

W-League

2009-10 Westfield W-League fixtures
Round 1

Round 2

Round 3

Round 4

Round 5

Round 6

Round 7

Round 8

Round 9

Round 10

2009-10 W-League fixtures

References

External links 
 Official website
 A-League website
 Melbourne Victory Videos

2009-10
2009–10 A-League season by team